Beaufortia puberula, commonly known as hairy-leaved beaufortia, is a plant in the myrtle family, Myrtaceae and is endemic to the southwest of Western Australia.

Description

The flowers are pink or deep pink to red and are arranged in heads on the ends of the branches. The flowers have 5 sepals, 5 petals and 5 bundles of stamens. The inner surface of the bundles is glabrous but the outer face in covered with long hairs.

Taxonomy and naming
Beaufortia puberula was first formally described in 1852 by Nikolai Turczaninow and the description was published in Bulletin de la Classe Physico-Mathématique de l'Académie Impériale des Sciences de Saint-Pétersbourg. The specific epithet (puberula) is a Latin word meaning "downy". In 1876, Ferdinand von Mueller described Beaufortia interstans in his Fragmenta Phytographiae Australiae, but that name is considered to be a synonym.

Distribution and habitat
Hairy beaufortia grows in sand, sometimes with laterite or loam and occurs near Merredin, Katanning and Southern Cross in the Avon Wheatbelt, Coolgardie, Geraldton Sandplains, Jarrah Forest and Mallee bioregions of south-western Western Australia.

Conservation
Beaufortia puberula is classified as "not threatened" by the Western Australian Government Department of Biodiversity, Conservation and Attractions.

References

puberula
Plants described in 1852
Endemic flora of Western Australia
Taxa named by Nikolai Turczaninow